The field of fire of a weapon (or group of weapons) is the area around it that can easily and effectively be reached by gunfire. The term 'field of fire' is mostly used in reference to machine guns. Their fields of fire incorporate the beaten zone.

The term originally came from the 'field of fire' in front of forts (and similar defensive positions), cleared so there was no shelter for an approaching enemy. 

Beaten zone is a concept in indirect infantry small arms fire, specifically machine guns.  It describes the area between the "first catch" and the "last graze" of a bullet's trajectory.  At the first of these points, a bullet will hit a standing man in the head, at the last of these points, as the bullet drops, it will hit a standing man in the feet. Anyone standing within a given gun's beaten zone will be hit somewhere from head to foot. 

Given that there is variance in the path of each bullet, and differences in mechanisms as designed, all machine guns have beaten zones with some width. A good example from history is the duels between Australian soldiers and German MG34 teams, during the 'April battles' and later, at Tobruk during 1941. The much narrower beaten zone of the Bren guns helped the Australians to win those duels, despite the lower rate of fire of their Mk1 .303" Bren guns. 

The concept works best as part of a static defence with the area covered by a position plotted out beforehand. Usually the machine guns will be mounted on a tripod and indirect fire sights (such as a dial sight) fitted in addition to, or instead of, direct fire ones. Fire can then be called in by spotters to engage specific points in the guns' field of fire, even if out of sight of the machine gunners.

Overlapping machine guns, creating a crossfire, using the beaten zone concept, together with the idea of enfilading were an important part of World War I.

Beaten zone can also refer to the area that shells will usually land in when fired from an artillery piece. It is in the shape of a rectangle with the longer sides parallel to the direction of fire because artillery tends to deviate more forwards and backwards than right and left.

References

Weapon operation